Zen in the Art of Writing: Essays on Creativity is a collection of essays by Ray Bradbury and published in 1990. The unifying theme is Bradbury's love for writing. 

Essays included are:
The Joy of Writing (1973)
Run Fast, Stand Still, Or, The Thing At the Top of the Stairs, Or, New Ghosts From Old Minds (1986)
How To Keep and Feed a Muse (1961)
Drunk, and in Charge of a Bicycle (1980)
Investing Dimes: Fahrenheit 451 (1982)
Just This Side of Byzantium: Dandelion Wine (1974)
The Long Road to Mars (1990)
On The Shoulders of Giants (1980)
The Secret Mind (1965)
Shooting Haiku in a Barrell (1982)
Zen in the Art of Writing (1973)
...On Creativity (No Date Given)

This book attempts to give creative ideas and inspiration to writers.

See also
Ray Bradbury bibliography

References

External links

1990 non-fiction books
Books by Ray Bradbury
Books about Zen
American essay collections